Charles Dwight Marsh (1855–1932) was an American botanist.

Marsh graduated with A.B. from Amherst College in 1877 and with Ph.D. in Zoology and Botany from the University of Chicago in 1904. Employed by the Bureau of Plant Industry, U.S. Department of Agriculture, he was in charge of field experiments on locoweed. In 1912 from January 15 to February 16 he did field research for the Biological Survey of the Panama Canal Zone, where he collected samples of the plankton in fresh waters.

Selected publications
The plankton of Lake Winnebago and Green Lake (1904)
The loco-weed disease of the plains (1909)
Stock-poisoning plants of the range (1924)

References

External links
 
 

1855 births
1932 deaths
American botanists
Amherst College alumni
University of Chicago alumni
People from Massachusetts